A pencil suit is a variety of salwar kameez. The suit follows the principles of a pencil skirt and merges it with the traditional salwar kameez. 

While salwars are loosely fitted pants, pencil suits have tightly fitted pants that follow the contours of the lady's leg. It differs from the churidar only in the lack of the ruches or the “churis” near the ankle. The kameez is of thigh length and has a side seam left open below the waist-line. This attire is often marched with a dupatta of matching or contrasting color.

As with most designer suits, a pencil suit is also embellished with beads, mirror work, zardozi or zari work. Simple and plain variants of the suit are also available for daily wear.

Description
The pencil pants are held up by a drawstring at the waist. The pants are fitted tightly against the contours of the lady's leg and don't have any extra cloth. Usually it is made of stretchable material to aid the easy movement and not to cause any discomfort to the lady while sitting down.

The pants completely narrow down towards the ankle and are held by a buttoned cuff at the ends. While conventional salwar kameez employs traditional cuts, crosscuts are used to stitch a pencil suit. This version of salwar kameez accentuates the curves of the female wearing it.

The kameez of the pencil suit is stitched as that of a regular kurta. Though the height of the kameez may vary according to the taste of the wearer, the usual style is to have it stitched at thigh length. A side seam is provided to aid easy movements and usually starts at the waist line. Different necklines are experimented with plunging neckline, boat line, high necks or mandarin neckline.

It is customary to wear a dupatta along with a pencil suit though it is not mandatory. Nowadays the dupatta is just draped over the hands or used as a fashion accessory. The dupatta are made in diaphanous, shimmery fabrics for this reason.

Pencil suits and Bollywood
Though the pencil suit was designed first by leading designers of the fashion industry, it became popularized only through Bollywood. After being adapted by some famous lead protagonists of Bollywood, pencil suits became fashionable.

Apart from being worn in movies, the actresses opted for pencil suits to be worn at public functions and events too. This further accelerated the adaption of pencil suits into the wardrobe of college and officegoing ladies.

Differences between pencil suits and churidar
To a point the pencil suit can be called a variant of churidar; but a pencil suit differs very much from the churidar, whose name derives their name from the ‘churis’ or ruche they form as they end near the ankle. Pencil suit lacks any type of ‘churi’ or any extra cloth.

Extra cloth is provided at the thigh in churidar to aid easy movements and comfort to the lady wearing it. There is no extra cloth provision in pencil suit, but for the ease of the wearer it is made of elastic fabrics that can stretch easily.

Indian clothing
Suits (clothing)
Hosiery
Trousers and shorts